In Irish mythology, Plúr na mBan (pronounced ploor-nu-mon)—meaning "the flower of women"—was the beautiful daughter of Oisín and Niamh.

References

Fenian Cycle